Erie—Lincoln was a federal electoral district in Ontario, Canada, that was represented in the House of Commons of Canada from 1997 to 2004, and was a provincial electoral district represented in the Legislative Assembly of Ontario from 1999 to 2007. This riding was created in 1996 from parts of Erie, Haldimand—Norfolk and Lincoln ridings. 
 
It consisted of the City of Port Colborne, the towns of Fort Erie and Lincoln and the townships of Wainfleet and West Lincoln in the Regional Municipality of Niagara, and the Town of Dunnville in the Regional Municipality of Haldimand-Norfolk.

The electoral district was abolished in 2003 when it was redistributed between Haldimand—Norfolk, Niagara Falls, Niagara West—Glanbrook, and Welland ridings.  It was replaced as a provincial riding in the 2007 provincial election by the new federal riding boundaries.

Members of Parliament
The riding has elected the following Members of Parliament:

Election results

See also 
 List of Canadian federal electoral districts
 Past Canadian electoral districts

References

External links 
Riding history from the Library of Parliament

Former federal electoral districts of Ontario